Anthony Jones (born 19 December 1974) is a former Australian rules footballer. He was the winner of the 2007 Sandover Medal.

Fremantle career
Jones played only 82 games over nine AFL seasons, missing many games to injuries to his knee, foot, hamstring, rib and shoulder as well as a punctured lung. A stress fracture of the right foot resulted in him being sidelined for the entire 1999 season and in an unusual injury for a footballer, a ruptured tendon in his chest caused him to miss the second half of the 2002 season.

Claremont career
After being delisted by Fremantle at the end of the 2003 season, Jones continued to play for Claremont where he has switched to the forward line with great success. He has finished in the top 4 of the Claremont Best and Fairest award in each year since then and in 2006 was named the captain of the state team that played South Australia.

In 2007, he became the oldest person to ever win the Sandover Medal, narrowly beating Subiaco's Brad Smith.

He has played 126 games for Claremont and skippered the club in 2008.

References

External links

1974 births
Australian rules footballers from Western Australia
Claremont Football Club players
Fremantle Football Club players
Living people
Sandover Medal winners
People educated at Perth Modern School
Western Australian State of Origin players